Lynn Township is one of the fifteen townships of Hardin County, Ohio, United States. As of the 2010 census the population was 572.

Geography
Located in the southern center of the county, it borders the following townships:
Cessna Township - north
Buck Township - east
Taylor Creek Township - south
McDonald Township - west

No municipalities are located in Lynn Township.

Name and history
Lynn Township was established in 1857. The township's name most likely comes from the linden trees which were once abundant there, although a share of the pioneer settlers had the last name Lynn. It is the only Lynn Township statewide.
According to his obituary, Sgt John Wesley Flinn (1823-1901) built the first cabin after the township was organized in 1859.

Government

The township is governed by a three-member board of trustees, who are elected in November of odd-numbered years to a four-year term beginning on the following January 1. Two are elected in the year after the presidential election and one is elected in the year before it. There is also an elected township fiscal officer, who serves a four-year term beginning on April 1 of the year after the election, which is held in November of the year before the presidential election. Vacancies in the fiscal officership or on the board of trustees are filled by the remaining trustees.

References

External links
County website

Townships in Hardin County, Ohio
1857 establishments in Ohio
Populated places established in 1857
Townships in Ohio